La Follette may refer to:

Places and schools 
LaFollette, Tennessee, U.S.
La Follette, Wisconsin, U.S.
La Follette High School, Madison, Wisconsin, U.S.
Robert M. La Follette School of Public Affairs, University of Wisconsin–Madison, U.S.

People
 La Follette family
 Belle Case La Follette, (1859–1931), women's suffrage activist in Wisconsin
 Bronson La Follette (1936–2018), Wisconsin Attorney General, 1965–1969, 1975-1987
 Charles M. La Follette (1898–1974), Congressman from Indiana
 Chester La Follette (1897–1993), American painter
 Doug La Follette (born 1940), Wisconsin Secretary of State 1975–1979 and 1983–present
 Harvey Marion LaFollette, (1858–1929) Indiana politician
 Philip La Follette (1897–1965), Governor of Wisconsin, 1931–1933 and 1935–1939
 Robert M. La Follette (1855–1925), U.S. Senator from Wisconsin, 1906–1925
 Robert M. La Follette Jr. (1895–1953), U.S. Senator from Wisconsin, 1925–1947
 Suzanne La Follette (1893–1982), American journalist and feminist
 William Leroy La Follette (1860–1934), Congressman from Washington, 1911–1919
 William Leroy LaFollette Jr. (1890–1950) member of the Washington Legislature

See also
Robert La Follette (disambiguation)